Apollo Sauroktonos (Apollo Lizard-killer) is the title of several 1st - 2nd century AD Roman marble copies of an original by the ancient Greek sculptor Praxiteles. The statues depict a nude adolescent Apollo about to catch a lizard climbing up a tree. Copies are included in the collections of the Louvre Museum, the Vatican Museums, and the National Museums Liverpool.

Original
The bronze original of this sculpture is attributed by Pliny (XXXIV, 69-70) to the Athenian sculptor Praxiteles and is usually dated to c.350-340 BC. Martial wrote an epigram about the statue (14, 172):  "Spare the lizard, treacherous boy, creeping toward you; it desires to perish by your hands."
The Cleveland Museum of Art claims to own a bronze original (or part-original) of this work. The work is currently being analyzed to verify this claim by scholars and archaeologists. Greece has raised questions about ownership and title.

Copies
About forty copies of the Apollo Sauroctonos are known to exist.  It is also depicted on Roman gems and coins.

A marble copy of the Apollo Sauroctonos is in the collection of the Louvre, with the catalogue number MR 78 (n° usuel Ma 441). Formerly in the Borghese collection, it was bought by Napoleon in 1807.

Iconography
The statue depicts Apollo as a youth, unusually for classical artwork which normally did not portray gods other than Dionysius and Eros as children or adolescents.  Martin Robertson has suggested that the statue alludes to the myth of Apollo slaying the serpent Python.  Jennifer Neils disputes this, noting that Python is depicted elsewhere in Greek art as a giant snake, and there is no reason to believe that ancient audiences would have associated the small lizard depicted on the Apollo Sauroctonos with Python.

Notes

External links

Louvre catalogue
Perseus entry

Ancient Greek and Roman sculptures of the Louvre
Antiquities acquired by Napoleon
Borghese antiquities
Sauroctonos
Lizards in art
Roman copies of 4th-century BC Greek sculptures
Sculptures by Praxiteles